Bobovo may refer to:
 Bobovo, Pljevlja, Montenegro
 Bobovo (Svilajnac), Serbia
 Bobovo pri Ponikvi, Slovenia
 Bobovo pri Šmarju, Slovenia